Eurocrat is a sans-serif typeface designed by Adrian Williams in 1986 for Club Type.

Name and Design
Eurocrat was inspired by the work of Members of the European Parliament of the European Economic Community. It attempts to combine various aspects of different European nationalities such that no one has dominance.

External links
 Identifont - Eurocrat
 Club Type - Eurocrat® Typeface
 http://www.clubtype.co.uk/Resources/PDFs/Specs/CT%20Eurocrat%20Bold%2BItalic.pdf
Sans-serif typefaces